The Czech Ladies Challenge is a women's professional golf tournament on the LET Access Series, held in the Czech Republic.

The event was first played in 2014 at Golf Park Plzeň-Dýšina in the city of Pilsen, 90 km west of Prague, also host to the LET's Sberbank Golf Masters, before moving closer to Prague. 

It has been the only Czech event on the LET Access Series schedule except in 2019 when the Czech Ladies Open was played as a dual-ranking event with the Ladies European Tour.

Winners

See also
Czech Ladies Open

References

External links

LET Access Series events
Golf tournaments in the Czech Republic